The Bishop of Nassau may refer to:

Anglican Bishop of Nassau
Roman Catholic Bishop of Nassau